Gabiriella Loose is a former West German slalom canoeist who competed in the 1980s. She won a silver medal in the K-1 team event at the 1985 ICF Canoe Slalom World Championships in Augsburg. She has been married for 7 years to her husband Nicolas Dietz.

References

West German female canoeists
Living people
Year of birth missing (living people)
Place of birth missing (living people)
Medalists at the ICF Canoe Slalom World Championships